Türklər may refer to:
 Türklər, Beylagan, Azerbaijan
 Türklər, Lachin, Azerbaijan
 Türkler, Çorum, Turkey